Rock climbing is a sport in which participants climb up, across, or down natural rock formations. The goal is to reach the summit of a formation or the endpoint of a usually pre-defined route without falling. Rock climbing is a physically and mentally demanding sport, one that often tests a climber's strength, endurance, agility and balance along with mental control. Knowledge of proper climbing techniques and the use of specialized climbing equipment is crucial for the safe completion of routes.

Because of the wide range and variety of rock formations around the world, rock climbing has been separated into several different styles and sub-disciplines, such as scrambling, bouldering, sport climbing, and trad (traditional) climbing another activity involving the scaling of hills and similar formations, differentiated by the rock climber's sustained use of hands to support their body weight as well as to provide balance.

Rock climbing competitions have the objectives of either completing the route in the least amount of attempts or attaining the farthest point on an increasingly difficult route. Indoor rock climbing is typically split into three disciplines: bouldering, lead climbing, and top roping.

History 

Paintings dating from 200 BC show Chinese men rock climbing. In early America, the cliff-dwelling Anasazi in the 12th century are thought to have been excellent climbers. Early European climbers used rock climbing techniques as a skill required to reach the summit in their mountaineering exploits. In the 1880s, European rock climbing became an independent pursuit outside of mountain climbing.

Although rock climbing was an important component of Victorian mountaineering in the Alps, it is generally thought that the sport of rock climbing began in the last quarter of the nineteenth century in various parts of Europe. Rock climbing evolved gradually from an alpine necessity to a distinct athletic activity. From the middle of the 19th century, the founder of the Alpine Club, John Ball, researched and made known the Dolomites. He was followed there by many other climbers such as Paul Grohmann, Edward R. Whitwell, Michael Innerkofler, Angelo Dibona and Tita Piaz with many first ascents.

Just before the First World War, there was a so-called "Mauerhakenstreit" (German: the Great Piton Debate of 1911) in Central Europe regarding the use of aids in climbing and mountaineering. Paul Preuss and Hans Dülfer were the main actors in these discussions, which have essentially continued to this day. Preuss propagated a pure climbing style. Angelo Dibona, on the other hand, was an advocate of security and was not fundamentally averse to pitons. When Luis Trenker asked how many pitons he had hit in total in life, Dibona replied: "Fifteen, six of them on the Laliderer north face, three on the Ödstein, two on the Croz dell 'Altissimo, one on the Einser and the rest on other difficult climbs."

Aid climbing, climbing using equipment that acts as artificial handhold or footholds, became popular during the period 1920–1960, leading to ascents in the Alps and in Yosemite Valley that were considered impossible without such means. However, climbing techniques, equipment and ethical considerations have evolved steadily.  Today, free climbing, climbing using holds made entirely of natural rock while using gear solely for protection and not for upward movement, is the most popular form of the sport. Free climbing has since been divided into several sub-styles of climbing dependent on belay configuration.

Over time, grading systems have also been created in order to compare more accurately the relative difficulties of the rock climbs.

On August 3, 2016, the International Olympic Committee (IOC) formally announced that sport climbing would be a medal sport in the 2020 Summer Olympics. The event debut was postponed to 2021, due to COVID-19.

Style 
In How to Rock Climb, John Long writes that for moderately skilled climbers simply getting to the top of a route is not enough- how one gets to the top matters. Within free climbing, there are several distinctions given to ascents:
 On-sighting a route requires that the climber ascend cleanly (without any falls or rest with the assistance of artificial equipment) on their first attempt without any foreknowledge.
 Flashing also requires a clean ascent on the first try, though the climber has previous information about the route (often called beta).
 Redpointing means to make a successful free ascent of the route after having previously tried it. This may include multiple days or even years of "working" the route to learn the specific sequence required.
 Pinkpointing means to make a successful free ascent of the route after having previously tried it, with protection (or "pro") such as quickdraws or trad equipment pre-placed on the route.

Style is mostly up to each individual climber and even among climbers the verbiage and definitions can differ. Climbers can be more dynamic (using greater force) or static (controlled movements) in their climbing style.

Style is the "weighted" method of how the activity is performed; left is 'better':

how the route from A to B was established:
 from below / from above
 alone / team
 continuous / besieged
 naturally protected / mix / bolted

how did I climb the route from A to B:
 free / on aid
 alone / team
 on sight / without fall / with fall / with rest
 protected on lead / preprotected

It is the style that describes your premise for your climbing. When you recognize a style, performance can be judged in relation to it. Since style is "weighted" in the range from "good" to "bad" (from left to right in the list), one can compare ascents of the same route. Good style is to keep the number of input factors (trials, time, equipment) low to leave the result uncertain, and the degree of adventure high. Since style is not the climb itself, you can climb the same route and improve your style over time. Tommy Caldwell and Kevin Jørgensen created their own style before starting the final push up Dawn Wall; they called it "Team Free", and were their yardstick for success.

Ethics 
Ethics are values of a more general nature that are linked to the activity 
 acting in accord with  "sportsmanship"
 acting in accord with nature preservation, sustainable, and LNT practices
 acting in accord with local culture and history

In sportsmanship, being a "good sport" is the highest honor; be honest, show respect for the opponent and the challenge – and not least take both success and adversity with dignified calm.  Go for the ball and not the man.

Ethics to consider when establishing new routes is locally rooted. In Elbsandstein, bolts are OK if placed from below, by hand, not by cracks and not too close. At Gritstone, only natural protection applies. On granite in California, bolts are OK to link cracks together, but only placed from below. In the Alps, several styles live in parallel: long and beautiful routes with a style like in California (M Piola and the Remy brothers), but also new routes with bolts close to cracks and old routes being retrobolted. The number of bolted routes has become so large that the UIAA is worried that the opportunity for naturally protected climbing will diminish. The UIAA uses both style and ethics in its argument, but the goal is to protect some areas that may be the arena for what they call "adventure climbing".

Types of climbing 
Most of the climbing done in modern times is considered free climbing—climbing using one's own physical strength, with equipment used solely as protection and not as support—as opposed to aid climbing, the gear-dependent form of climbing that was dominant in the sport's earlier days.  Free climbing is typically divided into several styles that differ from one another depending on the choice of equipment used and the configurations of their belay, rope and anchor systems.

As routes get higher off the ground, the increased risk of life-threatening injuries necessitates additional safety measures.  A variety of specialized climbing techniques and climbing equipment exists to provide that safety.  Climbers will usually work in pairs and utilize a system of ropes and anchors designed to catch falls.  Ropes and anchors can be configured in different ways to suit many styles of climbing, and roped climbing are thus divided into further sub-types that vary based on how their belay systems are set up.  Generally speaking, beginners will start with top roping and/or easy bouldering and work their way up to lead climbing and beyond.

Due to the length of time and extended endurance required, and because accidents are most likely to happen on the descent, rock climbers do not usually climb back down the route, or "downclimb," especially on the larger multiple pitch class III–IV, or multi-day grade IV–VI climbs.

Aid 

Still the most popular method of climbing big walls, aid climbers make progress up a wall by repeatedly placing and weighting gear that is used directly to aid ascent and enhance safety. This form of climbing is typically used when ascent is too technically difficult or impossible for free climbing.

Free 

The most commonly used method to ascend climbs refers to climbs where the climber's own physical strength and skill are relied upon to accomplish the climb. Free climbing may rely on top rope belay systems, or on lead climbing to establish protection and the belay stations. Anchors, ropes and protection are used to back up the climber and are passive as opposed to active ascending aids. Sub-types of free climbing are trad climbing and sport climbing. Free climbing is generally done as "clean lead" meaning no pitons or pins are used as protection.

Bouldering 

Climbing on short, low routes without the use of the safety rope that is typical of most other styles.  Protection, if used at all, typically consists of a cushioned bouldering pad below the route and a spotter, a person who watches from below and directs the fall of the climber away from hazardous areas. Bouldering may be an arena for intense and relatively safe competition, resulting in exceptionally high difficulty standards.

Solo 
Solo climbing, or soloing, is a style of climbing in which the climber climbs alone, without the assistance of a belay.

Deep-water solo (DWS) 

Deep-water soloing (or psicobloc) is similar to free soloing in that the climber is unprotected and without a rope, but should the climber fall, it is into deep water instead of onto the ground.

Free solo 

Free soloing, referred to as "soloing" in the UK, is single-person climbing without the use of any rope or protection system.  If a fall occurs and the climber is not over water (as in the case of deep water soloing), the climber is likely to be killed or seriously injured.  Though technically similar to bouldering, free solo climbing typically refers to routes that are far taller and/or far more lethal than bouldering. The term "highball" is used to refer to climbing on the boundary between free soloing and bouldering, where what is usually climbed as a boulder problem may be high enough for a fall to cause serious injury (20 ft. and higher) and hence could also be considered to be a free solo.

Roped solo 

Solo climbing with a rope secured at the beginning of the climb allowing a climber to self-belay as they advance.  Once the pitch is completed the soloist must descend the rope to retrieve their gear, and then reclimb the pitch.  This form of climbing can be conducted free or as a form of aid climbing.

Lead 

Lead climbing is a climbing technique where the lead climber ascends with the rope passing through intermittent anchors that are below them, rather than through a top anchor, as in top-rope climb. A partner belays from below the lead climber, by feeding out enough rope to allow upward progression without undue slack. As the leader progresses they use a runner and carabiners to clip the rope into intermediate points of protection such as active cams, or passive protection such as nuts; this limits the length of a potential fall. The leader also may clip into pre-placed bolts. Indoor gyms might have short runners pre-attached to fixed anchor points in the wall.

Unlike top-rope climbing, where the climber is always supported by an anchor located above the climber, lead climbing often involves scenarios where the climber will be attached to a point under him or her. In these cases, if the climber were to fall, the distance fallen would be much greater than that of top-rope and this is one of the main reasons lead climbing can be dangerous. The fall factor is the ratio of the height a climber falls and the length of rope available to absorb the fall. The higher the fall factor, the more force placed on the climber as the ropes decelerate them. The maximum fall factor is 2. It is often advised that climbers who are interested in lead climbing should learn from experienced climbers and participate in training sessions before lead climbing on their own.

Multi-pitch

The climbing rope is of a fixed length; the climber can only climb the length of the rope. Routes longer than the rope length are broken up into several segments called pitches; this is known as multi-pitch climbing. At the top of a pitch, the first climber to ascend (also known as the leader), sets up an anchor and then belays the second climber (also known as the follower) up to the anchor; as the second climber follows the route taken by the leader, the second climber removes ("cleans") the carabiners and anchors placed along the way in order to use them again on the next pitch. While "cleaning" the route, the follower attaches the carabiners and anchors to his or her harness belt loops. Once both climbers are at the top anchor, the leader begins climbing the next pitch, and so on, until the top of the route is reached.

In either case, upon completion of a route, climbers can walk back down if an alternate descent path exists, or rappel (abseil) down with the rope.

Sport 

The act of climbing single- or multi-pitch routes, protected by permanently-fixed bolts and anchors drilled into the rock, using a rope and the aid of a belayer.
Unlike traditional rock climbing, sport climbing involves the use of protection (bolts) placed with power drills or on rappel or permanent anchors which are attached to the rock walls. This is separate from bolted trad climbing.

Traditional 

Traditional or trad climbing involves rock climbing routes in which protection against falls is placed by the climber while ascending. In the unusual event bolts are used, these are placed on lead (usually with a manual drill). More commonly removable gear called cams, hexes, and nuts are placed in constrictions or cracks in the rock to protect against falls (in place of bolts) but not to aid the ascent directly. Due to the difficulty of placing bolts on lead, bolts tend to be placed farther apart than on many sport climbs. Once bolted on lead, if repeat ascensions can repeat the route using only the previously placed bolts for protection, the route would then be considered a sport climb, and repeat ascents would be considered to be done in the sport climbing rather than trad climbing style. Routes which are protected by a mixture of preplaced bolts and traditional climbing protection (cams/nuts/hexes) are commonly referred to as "mixed" routes, as in a mix of trad and sport climbing. Historically, pitons (a kind of deformable nail) were placed in constrictions in the rock instead of hexes, nuts and cams. These are difficult to remove and often destructive, resulting in a number of unremovable "fixed" pitons on many older traditionally protected routes. These are frequently used in a similar fashion to bolts, although they are not as trustworthy and by convention are not considered when evaluating if a route is a trad climb, sport climb or mixed climb the way bolts might be.

Top rope

Commonly known as top roping, top rope climbing is climbing in which a climber is belayed from the ground or the base of the route. A belay system resembling a pulley in which an anchor has been created at the top of a climb, through which the rope runs through from the belayer on the ground, to the climber on the ground (position before starting the climb). The rope is "taken-in," to clear up the slack as the climber moves upwards, so in the event of a fall, the climber falls the shortest distance possible. The length of a fall is normally no more than a meter, but can vary depending on the length of the route (the longer the rope, the more stretch the rope will undergo when weighted) and the weight of the climber compared to that of the belayer, among other things.

Top Roping
Belaying a climber from the top of a route, bringing them up to walk off or continue on to next pitch. A similarly safe system of climbing a route as top-roping, except the belayer has set the anchors at the top of the climb (normally after leading a route, in which case the climber is "seconding") to belay the climber either indirectly (belayer is part of the system and can be vulnerable when exposed to unexpected directions of pull and loading of the rope) or directly (belayer is not part of the system and belaying is done directly from the anchors using either an Italian / Munter Hitch or adapted use of a belay device), up the route from the top. If bolts have been clipped or traditional gear placements have been made, it is the job of the climber to collect and clean the route.

Via ferrata 

A method of fairly easily ascending a route, heavily dependent on permanent protection rather than using natural rock features to proceed.

Techniques 
Different types of rock require different techniques to successfully climb.

Crack 

In crack climbing, the climber ascends a rock crack using specific techniques such as jamming, stemming, and laying back. Cracks can vary in size from smaller than the width of a finger to larger than human body size. Climbers may protect their hands from sharp-edged rock with tape.

Face 

Face climbing is a type of climbing where climbers use features and irregularities in the rock such as finger pockets and edges to ascend a vertical rock face.

Slab 

Slab climbing, also known as friction climbing, is classified by the slope of the rock. A slope for slab climbing is less than ninety degrees, and prioritizes footwork. It is also known as friction climbing, and although this might sound easy, slab is considered one of the more challenging types of climbing. Popular techniques for slab are smearing, maintaining a center of gravity, and high steps. Two of the most renowned locations for slab climbing are Joshua Tree and Yosemite, but the Looking Glass mountain and Moab are also great options. The hardest slab route ever climbed is Cryptography located in Saint Loup, Switzerland, and ascended by Alessandro Zeni.

Simul 

Short for "simultaneous", simul climbing is when two climbers move at the same time.  The pseudo-lead climber places gear that the pseudo-follower collects.  When the leader runs low on gear they construct a belay station where the follower can join them to exchange gear.  The stronger climber is often the pseudo-follower since a fall by the follower would pull the leader from below towards the last piece of gear—a potentially devastating fall for the leader.  In contrast, a fall from the leader would pull the follower from above, resulting in a less serious fall.  Most speed ascents involve some form of simul climbing but may also include sections of standard free climbing and the use of placed gear for advancement (i.e. partial aid or pulling on gear).

Grading systems 

Climbing communities in many countries and regions have developed their own rating systems for routes. Ratings, or grades, record and communicate consensus appraisals of difficulty. Systems of ratings are inherently subjective in nature, and  variation of difficulty can be seen between two climbs of the same grade. Hence, there may be occasional disagreements arising from physiological or stylistic differences among climbers. The practice of rating a climb below its actual difficulty is known as sandbagging.

The most commonly used rating systems in the United States are the Yosemite Decimal System and the Hueco V-scale bouldering grade. The current ranges for climbing routes are 5.0 for easy beginner routes to 5.15 being world class and V0–V16, respectively. As the limit of human climbing ability has not yet been reached, neither grading system has a definite endpoint and they are thus subject to revision.

The ratings take into account multiple factors affecting a route, such as the slope of the ascent, the quantity and quality of available handholds, the distance between holds, ease of placing protection and whether advanced technical maneuvers are required. Typically the rating for the hardest move on the wall will be the rating for the whole climb. While the height of a route is generally not considered a factor, a long series of sustained hard moves will often merit a higher grade than a single move of the same technical difficulty. For example,  a climb with multiple 5.11 moves with no rests may thus be rated a 5.12.

Terminology 

As climbing routes or problems increase in difficulty, climbers learn to develop skills that help them complete the climbs clean. There are several techniques for hands and feet as well as terms for motions that combine the two. For indoor gyms, route setters visualize and create routes for climbers, placing different kinds of holds in specific parts of the wall at particular angles because they intend climbers to use certain techniques.

Types of holds 
Jug: A large open hold. Typically in the shape of a V.

Sloper: A negative smooth hold, typically in the shape of a ball or half moon.

Pockets: A hold that has a hole in it with just enough room for one or two fingers to fit inside of it.

Horn: A protruding hold that is typically smooth like a sloper. These are held by wrapping your arm, or entire palm around the hold. The more surface area you have on this hold the better.

Pinch: A pinch can either be used vertically or horizontally.  With a pinch hold, the muscles between the index finger and thumb are used.

Crimp/Crimper: A crimp hold allows climbers to use their fingertips to grab edges; the fingers arch.

Arête: A sharp corner or vertical edge

Volume: Volumes are wood or fiberglass structures that are supported by the climbing wall. They are generally giant, prism-like features that are introduced to change the dynamics of the wall. In Europe large climbing holds can be considered volumes, while in the US, the actual surface volume of the wall is changed by a volume.

Environments

Indoor 

Indoor climbing occurs in buildings on artificial rock structures. This permits for climbing in all types of weather and at all times of the day. Climbers climb indoors to improve their skills and techniques, as well as for general exercise or fun. Indoor climbing gyms typically provide rope setups and ensure that new climbers know safe techniques.

While indoor climbing is meant to be graded the same as outdoor climbing, it can sometimes be inaccurate. For example, a small gym might rate a route as a 5.10d, whereas a larger gym might have chosen to grade the route a 5.10a. Nonetheless, indoor gyms are a convenient and climate-controlled space to train for the outdoor world.

Outdoor
Outdoors, climbs usually take place on sunny days when the holds are dry and provide the best grip, but climbers can also attempt to climb at night or in adverse weather conditions if they have the proper training and equipment. However, night climbing or climbing in adverse weather conditions will increase the difficulty and danger on any climbing route.

Equipment 

Most climbers choose to wear specialized rubber climbing shoes which are often of a smaller size than their normal street shoes in order to improve sensitivity towards foot placements and use the tightness to their advantage.  Climbing chalk (MgCO3) is commonly used as a drying agent to minimize sweating of the hands. Most other equipment is of a protective nature. Rock climbing is inherently dangerous, so to minimize the potential consequences resulting from a fall, climbers use protection. The most basic protective equipment is a climbing rope. Climbing pioneers would attach the rope to themselves; in the event of a fall, the rope would usually cause injury to the climber in the hope that it prevented death. With advances in technology came the development of specialized harnesses, carabiners which are used for clipping into belay and rappel anchors and connecting gear, and belay devices which are used to catch a falling climber, hold or lower a climber and for rappelling. Eventually, the placement of bolts with the use of quickdraws led to the rise of sport climbing. Traditional climbers developed the spring-loaded camming device, which allowed a wider variety of climbing styles to be adequately protected compared to chocks and hexes. Traditionally pitons were used however in most areas protection which damages the rock is discouraged. Most climbers choose to wear a specialized climbing helmet to protect them from falling rocks or equipment or head injuries from crashing into rocks.

Injuries 

Injuries in rock climbing are mainly sports injuries that occur due to falls or overuse. Injuries due to falls are relatively uncommon; the vast majority of injuries result from overuse, most often occurring in the fingers, elbows, and shoulders. Such injuries are often no worse than torn calluses, cuts, burns and bruises. There are a number of skincare products specifically for climbers available in the market. However, overuse symptoms, if ignored, may lead to permanent damage especially to tendons, tendon sheaths, ligaments, and capsules. Taping of fingers and elbows to prevent injuries is common practice and there are various techniques for taping.

Photo topos 

Illustrated photo-topos are widely used in rock climbing. Many of them are found in climbing and mountaineering guidebooks such as those published by Rockfax, or the British Mountaineering Council. Full-colour photo-topo diagrams have replaced the previous generation of text based guidebooks, which were illustrated with hand-drawn diagrams. The use of drones has helped improve the quality of images of many of the cliffs.

Site access

Cultural considerations 
Some areas that are popular for climbing, for example in the United States and Australia, are also sacred places for indigenous peoples.  Many such indigenous people would prefer that climbers not climb these sacred places and have made this information well known to climbers.  A well-known example is the rock formation that Americans have named Devils Tower National Monument. Native American cultural concerns also led to complete climbing closures at Cave Rock at Lake Tahoe, Monument Valley, Shiprock and Canyon de Chelly.

Climbing activities can sometimes encroach on rock art sites created by various Native American cultures and early European explorers and settlers. The potential threat to these resources has led to climbing restrictions and closures in places like Hueco Tanks, Texas, and portions of City of Rocks National Reserve, Idaho.

In Australia, the monolith Uluru (Ayers Rock) is sacred to local indigenous communities and climbing is banned on anything but the established ascent route (and even then climbing is discouraged, and soon to be discontinued). Elsewhere in Australia, many formerly popular climbing routes in areas such as the Grampians and Arapiles have been closed due to indigenous cultural concerns.

Indigenous peoples are not the only cultures that object to climbing on certain rock formations. Professional climber Dean Potter kicked off a major controversy when he ignored long-accepted convention to scale Delicate Arch in 2006, resulting in strict new climbing regulation in Arches National Park.

Private property 
Many significant rock outcrops exist on private land. Some people within the rock climbing community have been guilty of trespassing in many cases, often after land ownership transfers and previous access permission is withdrawn. In the U.S. the climbing community responded to access closures by forming the Access Fund. This is an "advocacy organization that keeps U.S. climbing areas open and conserves the climbing environment. Five core programs support the mission on national and local levels: public policy, stewardship and conservation (including grants), grassroots activism, climber education and land acquisition." In the U.K. the British Mountaineering Council represents climbers and their interest of public access to crags, cliffs and boulders. In Europe there are different rules in different countries regarding the rights of landowners and climbers.

Environmental impact 

Although many climbers adhere to "minimal impact" and "leave no trace" practices, rock climbing is sometimes damaging to the environment.  Common environmental damages include: soil erosion, breaking rock features, chalk accumulation, litter, abandoned bolts and ropes, human excrement, introduction of foreign plants through seeds on shoes and clothing, as well as damage to native plant species (especially those growing in cracks and on ledges as these are often intentionally removed during new route development through a process commonly referred to as cleaning).

Clean climbing is a style of rock climbing which seeks to minimize some of the aesthetically damaging side effects of some techniques used in trad climbing and more often, aid climbing by avoiding using equipment such as pitons, which damage rock.

Climbing can also interfere with raptor nesting since the two activities often take place on the same precipitous cliffs. Many climbing area land managers institute nesting season closures of cliffs known to be used by protected birds of prey like eagles, falcons and osprey.

Many non-climbers also object to the appearance of climbing chalk marks, anchors, bolts and slings on visible cliffs. Since these features are small, visual impacts can be mitigated through the selection of neutral, rock-matching colors for bolt hangers, webbing and chalk. The use of certain types of climbing gear is banned altogether at some crags due to the risk of damage to the rock face. In such cases,  climbers use knotted slings and ropes for climbing protection.

Blowtorching is another climbing-induced impact that affects the rocks themselves. Blowtorching is when a climber uses a blowtorch to dry holds on a wet route. This mainly happens in areas that tend to have wet climbing conditions. Blowtorching is not only detrimental to the rock itself and can have permanent damage but it also leaves a very large burn mark that most non-climbers would object to the appearance of.

Vandalism 
The most significant form of vandalism directly attributable to rock climbers is the alteration of the climbing surface to render it more climber-friendly.

With the advent of hard, bolted sport climbing in the 1980s, many routes were "chipped" and "glued" to provide additional features, allowing them to be climbed at the standard of the day. This attitude quickly changed as the safer sport climbing technique allowed climbers to push hard without much risk, causing the formerly more-or-less fixed grades to steadily rise. Altering routes began to be seen as limiting and pointless.

Unlike traditional climbing which generally uses protection only as a backup in case of falls, some forms of climbing—like sport climbing, canyoneering or, especially, aid climbing—rely heavily on artificial protection to advance, either by frequent falls or by directly pulling on the gear. Often these types of climbing involve multiple drilled holes in which to place temporary bolts and rivets, but in recent years an emphasis on clean techniques has grown.

Today, the charge of vandalism in climbing is more often a disagreement about the appropriateness of drilling and placing permanent bolts and other anchors. Although new fixed anchors are rarely placed by climbers, their dependency on the existing fixed anchors results in the difference between life and death. But the existing anchors remain on the climbing structure for long periods of time, changing the dynamic of the structure itself. Due to the permanent impact of the fixed anchors in wilderness areas, it was prohibited by the Wilderness Act. However, in 1990, there was a movement by the Forest Service and the Task Group to change the regulations such that fixed anchors would be allowed but still regulated in wilderness areas. These improvements led to protection for both the climbers and the Wilderness Act. Typically in the USA, the first ascensionists decide where to place protection on a new route and later climbers are supposed to live with these choices. This can cause friction and retro-bolting when the route is perceived to be dangerous to climbers who actually lead at the grade of the climb, since the first ascensionists often lead at a higher grade and therefore do not require as much protection. Failing to properly design a new route at its grade is considered arrogant and very poor form. Even in strongholds of rock-climbing tradition like Yosemite National Park, many routes are being gradually upgraded to safer standards of protection.

See also 

 Lists and glossaries
 List of climbers
 List of climbing topics
 Deaf climbers
 Climbing organizations
 Glossary of knots common in climbing
 Related activities
 Outdoor education
 International Federation of Sport Climbing

References

Further reading 
 
 
 

 
Articles containing video clips
Types of climbing
Mountaineering techniques